County Armagh was a constituency represented in the Irish House of Commons, the house of representatives of the Kingdom of Ireland, until 1800.

History
In the Patriot Parliament of 1689 summoned by King James II, Armagh County was represented with two members.

Members of Parliament

References

Bibliography

Constituencies of the Parliament of Ireland (pre-1801)
Historic constituencies in County Armagh
1800 disestablishments in Ireland
Constituencies disestablished in 1800